Element Skateboards is an American skateboard company, founded in 1992 by Johnny Schillereff, that manufactures skateboard decks, apparel, and footwear. In 2014, Element created and moved to The Branch, a creative space in Costa Mesa, California. In 2018 Element was acquired by Boardriders, Inc. and has headquarters in Huntington Beach, U.S. and Saint-Jean-de-Luz, France.

Stores
Company stores are located in  New York City, Honolulu, Orlando (Universal CityWalk), London, Montreal, Sydney, Melbourne, Madrid and Paris. The company as of 2016 no longer operates its store in Burlington, Canada.

Team
Team as of February 2023:

Pros
 Brandon Westgate
 Ethan Loy
 Gabriel Fortunato
 Jaakko Ojanen
 Madars Apse
 Mark Appleyard
 Nick Garcia
 Tom Schaar
 Donny Barley

Ams
 Eetu Toropainen
 Funa Nakayama
 Greyson Beal
 Leon Charo-Tite
 Ryo Sejiri
 Victor Cascarigny
 Vinicius Costa
 Vitoria Medonça

References 

Skateboarding companies
Sporting goods manufacturers of the United States
Clothing brands of Australia
Clothing brands of the United States
Retail companies of the United States
Shoe companies of the United States
Companies based in Irvine, California
Clothing companies established in 1992
Manufacturing companies established in 1992
1990s fashion
2000s fashion
2010s fashion